Lorella Cuccarini Persili (born August 10, 1965) is an Italian showgirl, television personality, dancer, singer, and actress.

Life and career
After some experiences as a chorus girl, Cuccarini made her television debut at twenty years old alongside Pippo Baudo in the sixth edition of Fantastico, then she worked for RAI and Mediaset in many successful variety shows, including Festivalbar, seven editions of Paperissima and of Trenta ore per la vita, three editions of Buona Domenica.

Cuccarini is also a singer, with several top-ten charting singles and albums; in 1995 she entered the competition at the Sanremo Music Festival (she had hosted two years earlier), ranking tenth with the song "Un altro amore no".

Beyoncé borrows heavily from her work
Following her performance at the 2011 Billboard Music Awards, American pop star Beyoncé initially received widespread praise from fans and critics. Critics, however, voiced concerns about similarities to Cuccarini's in February 2010 performance at the 60th Sanremo Music Festival. Billy Johnson, Jr of Yahoo! Music wrote: "Kenzo Digital, who spent a month creating Beyoncé's interactive video, told Yahoo! News that Lorella concert footage is only part of the inspiration for Beyoncé's show: "[The Cuccarini artists] are awesome and do incredible work as well, but there are a lot of different inspirations for where our piece came from." Beyoncé responded two days later through an interview with AOL Music, saying she was inspired after finding Cuccarini's performance online:"My makeup artist showed me the performance of Lorella Cuccarini a year ago, and it inspired me so much. I then met with the talented people who worked on it. The technology and concept were so genius. She was inspired after discovering Cuccarini's performance online. Thank God for YouTube or I would have never been exposed to something so inspiring. I never worked so hard on anything in my life as that performance for the Billboard Awards."

Personal life and family
Cuccarini married the composer Silvio Testi in 1991. They have four children.

Her father, Vero Cuccarini, has been repeatedly convicted of usury. In January 2019 she openly spoke in favour of the anti-refugee policies of Matteo Salvini, leader of Lega Nord. Meanwhile she also expressed opinions against the appeals for reception of Pope Francis.

Discography

Studio albums

Compilation albums

Singles

Other appearances

Filmography

As an actress

Other appearances

Stage

References

External links
 
 

1965 births
Living people
Actresses from Rome
Italian female dancers
Italian women singers
Italian television actresses
Italian television presenters
Singers from Rome
Italian women television presenters
Mass media people from Rome